Sinjong of Goryeo (11 August 1144 – 15 February 1204, r. 1197–1204) was the twentieth monarch of the Goryeo dynasty of Korea. The fifth son of King Injong, Sinjong took the throne after his brother King Myeongjong was sent into exile by Choe Chungheon.

He was wise, but like his brother before him had no true power, which was in the hands of Choe Chungheon (this marked the beginning of the Choe family's military rule). Sinjong also witnessed the kin strife of the Choe family and soon after became ill, abdicating in favor of his son King Huijong.

Family 
Father: Injong of Goryeo (고려인종, 29 October 1109 – 10 April 1146) 
Grandfather: Yejong of Goryeo (고려예종, 11 February 1079 – 15 May 1122) 
Grandmother: Queen Sundeok of the Incheon Yi clan (순덕왕후 이씨; 15 April 1094– 21 September 1118)
Mother: Queen Gongye of the Jangheung Im clan (Korean: 공예왕후 임씨
Grandfather: Im Won-hu (임원후)
Grandmother: Lady Yi, of the Bupyeong Yi clan (부평 이씨)
Consorts and their Respective issue(s)
Queen Seonjeong of the Gim clan (선정왕후 김씨, d. 17 August 1222), his second half-cousin once removed
Huijong of Goryeo (고려희종, 21 June 1181 – 31 August 1237), first son
Wang Seo (양양공 왕서), Duke Yangyang, second son
Princess Hyohoe (효회공주, 1183–1199), first daughter
Princess Gyeongnyeong (경녕궁주), second daughter

Popular culture
 Portrayed by Lee Woo-seok in the 2003-2004 KBS TV series Age of Warriors.

See also
 History of Korea
 List of Korean monarchs

References

 

12th-century Korean monarchs
13th-century Korean monarchs
1144 births
1204 deaths